Eric Snookes (born 6 March 1955) is an English former footballer who played at left-back for a number of clubs. He signed as a professional with Preston North End in 1972 and made his debut at Brighton on 31 March 1973, playing in the final seven matches of the season. He returned to the first team in November 1973 and made thirteen more appearances, his final match being at home to Fulham on 23 February 1974. He was then released at the end of the 1973–1974 season, moving that summer to Crewe Alexandra and later to Southport, Rochdale and Bolton Wanderers before concluding his playing career in non-league with Macclesfield Town.

References

External links
 

English footballers
English Football League players
Rochdale A.F.C. players
1955 births
Living people
Preston North End F.C. players
Crewe Alexandra F.C. players
Southport F.C. players
Bolton Wanderers F.C. players
Macclesfield Town F.C. players
Association football defenders